Odisha Adarsha Vidyalaya, Jayantigiri, Jeypore known as OAV Jayantigiri, Jeypore or OAV Jeypore, is a school under the School and Mass Education Department, Government of Odisha. The school is located near the hilly areas of Jayantigiri in Jeypore Block of Koraput District, Odisha, India.

History 
Odisha Adarsha Vidyalaya Sangathan was established on September 19, 2015, as a society under The Society Registration Act of Odisha. Odisha Adarsha Vidyalaya was founded by the Odisha Department of School and Mass Education.

The General Body is the apex body of the Sangathan headed by Hon’ble Minister, School & Mass Education as Chairman. The Executive Body is headed by DC-cum-ACS as Chairman.  Present Advisor-cum-Working President is Upendra Tripathyappointed on 3 August 2021 after Dr Bijaya Kumar Sahoo succumbs To Covid-19 on 3 June 2021.

Admission 
Students from Jeypore block, Class VI, are selected through an entrance Exam conducted each year by Odisha Adarsha Vidyalaya Sangathan and are given admission to VIth standard/class. The test is largely non-verbal and objective in nature and is designed to prevent any disadvantage to children from rural areas. It also conducts lateral entry based upon availability of seats. The school runs classes from class 6th to 12th

Affiliation 
The school is affiliated with the Central Board of Secondary Education (CBSE)., New Delhi with the affiliation number 1520115.

Facilities 
The school has been equipped by smart classrooms with digital screens, smartboards, computer lab, and science labs.

Activities 
The school observes important commemorative days, Competitions like

 Science Olympiad
 Mathematics Olympiad
 National Talent Search Exam
 National Means Cum Merit Examination
 Science Exhibition

Various Inter-House Cocurricular Activities like

 Youth Parliament
 Hindi week
 Annual sports meets
 Annual Day
 Mass Plantation
 National Science Day

References 

 https://oav.edu.in/ 

Schools in Odisha
2016 establishments in Odisha
Educational institutions established in 2016
Schools in India
Schools in India by state or union territory
Koraput district
Odisha-related lists
Central Board of Secondary Education